The City of Lithgow is a local government area in the Central West region of New South Wales, Australia. The area is located adjacent to the Great Western Highway and the Main Western railway line.

The Mayor of the City of Lithgow Council is Cr. Maree Statham, who is unaligned with any political party.

Main towns and villages 
The council seat is located in the city of Lithgow, the largest regional centre. The area also includes the towns and villages of Bell, Ben Bullen, Bogee, Bowenfels, Capertee, Clarence, Cullen Bullen, Dargan, Glen Alice, Glen Davis, Hampton, Hartley, Marrangaroo, Meadow Flat, Newnes, Portland, Rydal, Sodwalls, Tarana, and Wallerawang.

Demographics 

According to the Australian Bureau of Statistics on 2006 census night there were:
 20,981 people living in the area, making the City the 77th largest Local Government Area in New South Wales. It was equal to 0.3% of the New South Wales population of 6,827,694
 116 more people living in the area than the previous period, giving the City the 82nd largest population growth in a Local Government Area in New South Wales. It was equal to 0.2% of the 58,753 increase in the population of New South Wales
 in percentage terms, an increase of 0.6% in the number of people over the year, the 92nd fastest growth in population of a Local Government Area in New South Wales.  In New South Wales the population grew by 0.9%
 was an increase in population over the 10 years of 733 people or 3.6% (0.4% in annual average terms), the 81st highest rate of a Local Government Area in New South Wales.  In New South Wales the population grew by 622,966 or 10% (1.0% in annual average terms) over the same period.

Council

Current composition and election method
Lithgow City Council is composed of nine Councillors elected proportionally as a single ward. All Councillors are elected for a fixed four-year term of office. The Mayor is elected by the Councillors at the first meeting of the Council. The most recent election was held on 10 September 2016, and the makeup of the Council is as follows:

The current Council, elected in 2016, in order of election, is:

Heritage listings
The City of Lithgow has a number of heritage-listed sites, including:
 Ben Bullen, Wallerawang-Gwabegar railway: Ben Bullen railway station
 Bowenfels, Great Western Highway: Fernhill, Bowenfels
 Bowenfels, via Kirkley Street: Lithgow Heavy Anti Aircraft Gun Stations and Dummy Station
 Bowenfels, Main Western railway: Bowenfels railway station
 Bowenfels, Main Western railway: Bowenfels rail viaducts
 Hartley, Great Western Highway: Hartley historic site
 Hartley, 200 Jenolan Caves Road: Military Station archaeological site
 Hartley, The Old Bathurst Road: Cox's Road and Early Deviations - Hartley, Clarence Hilly Range and Mount Blaxland Precinct
 Hartley Vale, Hartley Vale Road: Collits' Inn
 Lithgow, Bent Street: Lithgow Valley Colliery and Pottery Site
 Lithgow, Brewery Lane: Lithgow Zig Zag
 Lithgow, Gas Works Lane: Lithgow Coal Stage Signal Box
 Lithgow, Inch Street: Lithgow Blast Furnace
 Lithgow, Jenolan Caves Road: McKanes Falls Bridge
 Lithgow, Main West Line 156.334 km, James Street: Lithgow Underbridge
 Lithgow, Main Western railway: Eskbank railway station, New South Wales
 Lithgow, Main Western railway: Ten Tunnels Deviation
 Lithgow, Railway Parade: Lithgow railway station
 Lithgow, Top Points Zig Zag railway: Cooerwull railway footbridge
 Marrangaroo, Main Western railway: Marrangaroo railway viaduct
 Old Bowenfels, 70 Mudgee Street: Bowenfels National School Site
 Portland, Carlton Road: Raffan's Mill and Brick Bottle Kilns
 Portland, Williwa Street: Portland Cement Works Precinct
 Rydal, Main Western railway: Rydal railway station
 Rydal, Main Western railway: Rydal rail underbridges
 Sodwalls, off Cuthill Road: Cox's Road and Early Deviations - Sodwalls, Fish River Descent Precinct
 Tarana, Main Western railway: Tarana railway station
 Wallerawang, Main Street: St John the Evangelist Church, Wallerawang
 Wallerawang, Main Western railway: Coxs River railway bridges, Wallerangang
 Wallerawang, Main Western railway: Wallerawang railway station
 Wambool, Main Western railway: Wambool old-rail truss overbridges

References

External links
Lithgow Tourism Information

 
Lithgow